The 1898 Launceston by-election was held on 3 August 1898.  It was held due to the death of the incumbent Liberal MP Thomas Owen.  It was retained by the Liberal candidate Sir John Fletcher Moulton.

References

By-elections to the Parliament of the United Kingdom in Cornish constituencies
August 1898 events
1898 elections in the United Kingdom
1898 in England
Launceston, Cornwall